The following article presents a summary of the 1976 football (soccer) season in Brazil, which was the 75th season of competitive football in the country.

Campeonato Brasileiro Série A

Semifinals

Final

Internacional declared as the Campeonato Brasileiro champions.

State championship champions

Youth competition champions

Other competition champions

Brazilian clubs in international competitions

Brazil national team
The following table lists all the games played by the Brazil national football team in official competitions and friendly matches during 1976.

References

 Brazilian competitions at RSSSF
 1976 Brazil national team matches at RSSSF

 
Seasons in Brazilian football
Brazil